APMA or Apma may refer to:
 All Pakistan Minorities Alliance, founded by Shahbaz Bhatti
 American Podiatric Medical Association
 American Preventive Medical Association, former name of the Alliance for Natural Health USA
 Apma language, a language of Vanuatu
 4-Aminophenylmercuric acetate

See also
 Ap Ma language, also known as the Kambot language, a language of New Guinea